Chapli Kebab or Chapli Kabab is a Pashtun-style minced kebab, usually made from ground beef, mutton or chicken with various spices in the shape of a patty. The Chapli Kabab originates from Afghanistan. The Pekhawri Chapli Kabab is made with beef and is a popular street food throughout South Asia, including Pakistan, India, Afghanistan and Bangladesh.

Originally made with beef in Peshawar, it can now be found with chicken and lamb as well. Depending on region, Chapli Kabab recipe has evolved, adding regional spices to it. But in Peshawar, Chapli Kababs are still prepared with minimum ingredients.

In India, Chapli Kabab can also be found as street food in the cities of Bhopal, Lucknow, Delhi and Hyderabad; where Muslims have a denser population.

Chapli Kababs are broadly consumed in Dhaka, Bangladesh. But it is most popular during the time of Eid-ul Azha and in ramadan as part of iftar.

Chapli Kababs can be served and eaten hot with naan or as a bun kebab.

Origins
Mughal culinary influences in the region popularised a number of kebab dishes, resulting in local recipes such as the Chapli Kebab. The name chapli is said to be derived from the Pashto word chaprikh/chapdikh/chapleet, meaning "flat" – alluding to the kebab's light, round and flattened texture. Another theory is that the name is derived from chappal, the local word for sandals – implying the average shape and size of a kebab, which resembles that of a front part of the chappal sole, or it seems to have been flattened by a sandal. Locals mostly agree with the first theory of Chapli being a short version of Chapleet (aka, Chapdikh). 

Chapli Kabab is served in thousands of kebab houses throughout Pakistan and Afghanistan Such eateries have rapidly expanded in other cities as well. Today, the Chapli Kebab is featured on the menu of South Asian restaurants across the world.

Ingredients and preparation
The Chapli Kebab is prepared with raw, marinated mince and the meat can be either beef or lamb/mutton. The main ingredients include wheat flour, various herbs and spices such as chili powder, coriander leaves, followed by smaller quantities of onions, tomatoes, eggs, ginger, coriander or cumin seeds, green chillies, corn starch, salt and pepper, baking powder and citric juice, like that of lime or lemon.

The kebabs can be fried shallow or deep in vegetable cooking oil over medium heat. Some chefs fry the kebabs in lamb fat over wood-fired stoves to lend an organic flavour. This approach is avoided by some gastronomist, citing health-conscious reasons.

Serving
Once cooked, Chapli Kebabs can be served and garnished with parsley, chopped onions and tomatoes, along with other accompaniments such as various chutney sauces, salad, yoghurt, pickles or nuts. The Chapli Kebab is best served aromatic, moist and spicy. It is considered a specialty of Pashtun cuisine and often served to guests. The kebab is commonly consumed in meals with bread such as naan, rice dishes such as Kabuli pulao, or wrapped in fast food. In winters, green tea such as kahwah may traditionally be served alongside it, while cold drinks are preferred in the summers.

See also

 List of kebabs
 Pashtun cuisine
 Pakistani fast food
 Pakistani meat dishes
Pakistani cuisine

Notes

References

Appetizers
Beef dishes
Goat dishes
Kebabs
Lamb dishes
Pakistani fast food
Pakistani meat dishes
Pashtun cuisine
Street food in Pakistan
Food watchlist articles
Ground meat
Pakistani cuisine
Afghan cuisine
Indian cuisine
Bangladeshi cuisine